is a funicular railway station on the Hakone Tozan Cable Car Line in the town of Hakone, Ashigarashimo District, Kanagawa Prefecture, Japan, operated by Hakone Tozan Railway.

Lines
Kōen-Kami Station is served by the Hakone Tozan Cable Car, and is 0.48 km from the line's starting point at Gōra Station.

Layout
The station has two opposed side platforms on either side of a single track. The station is unattended.

History
Kōen-Kami Station opened on December 1, 1921, with the opening of the Hakone Tozan Cable Car Line. It was named after "the upside of Gora Park".

Bus services
Bus stop "Hakone bijutsukan (Hakone Art Museum)" near this station (Hakone Tozan Bus).
for Gora Station, Hakone Open-Air Museum, Kowaki-en, Yunessun, and Ten-yu
for Pola Museum of Art, The Little Prince and Saint-Exupéry Museum, Senkyoro-mae (transfer for Togendai (Lake Ashi)), Hakone Venetian Glass Museum, Sengoku (transfer for Gotemba Premium Outlets, JR Gotemba Station and Shinjuku Station), Lalique Museum, and Hakone Botanical Garden of Wetlands

See also
 List of railway stations in Japan

References

External links

Hakone Tozan Railway website
Hakone Tozan Bus Route Map

Railway stations in Kanagawa Prefecture
Railway stations in Japan opened in 1921
Buildings and structures in Hakone, Kanagawa